Koppelaar is a surname. Notable people with the surname include:

 Frans Koppelaar (born 1943), Dutch painter
 Henk Koppelaar (born 1953), Dutch computer scientist 
 Rutger Koppelaar (born 1993), Dutch athlete 

Dutch-language surnames
Surnames of Dutch origin